Y Kant Tori Read was an American synthpop band fronted by singer-songwriter Tori Amos. The band released one album, also called Y Kant Tori Read, which was largely unsuccessful. Atlantic Records abandoned promoting the album completely after two months of release. The band originally consisted of vocalist and keyboardist Amos, guitarist Steve Caton, drummer Matt Sorum (later of Guns N' Roses), and bassist Brad Cobb. They worked with record producer Joe Chiccarelli and Kim Bullard, later of Kajagoogoo. The name comes from an incident in Amos's childhood where she was asked to leave the Peabody Conservatory because she refused to read sheet music.

A music video for their song "The Big Picture" was made, but the only member of the band featured was Amos, since by then, unable to withstand pressure from Atlantic Records, she had jettisoned the rest of them with the exception of Steve Caton.

Two singles were released. The first, "The Big Picture", was commercially issued exclusively as a 7" vinyl single, and without a picture sleeve, though the 12" vinyl promo did have one. The second single, "Cool on Your Island", was issued as a cassette single and 7" vinyl single, this time with a picture sleeve; and in various promo 7" vinyl singles. Neither single was successful.

Discography

Album
Y Kant Tori Read (1988, 2017 re-release)

Re-release
The 2017 Rhino Records re-release  was made available on streaming services, with an additional limited (4000 copies) vinyl released for Fall 2017 Record Store Day.

Singles
"The Big Picture" (single, 1988)
"Cool on Your Island" (single, 1988)

References

American pop music groups
American synth-pop groups
Tori Amos